Ildi Gruda (born 13 December 1999) is an Albanian footballer who plays as a midfielder for Teuta Durrës in the Kategoria Superiore.

Career

Teuta Durrës
In January 2020, Gruda moved to Albanian Superliga club Teuta Durrës on a free transfer. He made his league debut for the club on 26 January 2020, coming on as an 81st-minute substitute for Sherif Kallaku in a 1-0 home victory over Bylis.

References

External links

1999 births
Living people
KF Shënkolli players
KF Teuta Durrës players
Kategoria e Parë players
Kategoria Superiore players
Albanian footballers
Association football midfielders
People from Lezhë